Daniel Gunkel (born 7 June 1980) is a German former professional footballer who played as a midfielder.

Career
Gunkel was born in Frankfurt. He made his debut on the professional league level in the 2. Bundesliga for Energie Cottbus on 8 August 2004, when he started the game against 1. FC Köln.

After playing for 1. FSV Mainz 05 and then TuS Koblenz in the Bundesliga and 2. Bundesliga, he played for Greek club Panetolikos F.C. for half of the 2010–11 season. He returned to Germany in February 2011, signing with Kickers Offenbach.

Personal life
Gunkel also holds Ivorian citizenship. His father is a diplomat from Ivory Coast and his mother is German.

References

External links

1980 births
Living people
German footballers
German people of Ivorian descent
Association football midfielders
Bundesliga players
2. Bundesliga players
3. Liga players
Rot-Weiss Frankfurt players
Eintracht Frankfurt II players
Dresdner SC players
SV Wehen Wiesbaden players
FC Energie Cottbus players
1. FSV Mainz 05 players
TuS Koblenz players
Panetolikos F.C. players
Kickers Offenbach players
BSV Schwarz-Weiß Rehden players
German expatriate footballers
German expatriate sportspeople in Greece
Expatriate footballers in Greece
Footballers from Frankfurt